The Wamba River is a river in the Democratic Republic of the Congo (DRC) and Angola. In Angola it is known as the Uamba River.

Location

See also
List of rivers of the Democratic Republic of the Congo
List of rivers of Angola

References

Rivers of the Democratic Republic of the Congo
Rivers of Angola
International rivers of Africa
Border rivers
Angola–Democratic Republic of the Congo border